The Princess Alice Bank is a submerged seamount located  southwest of the island of Pico and  southwest of the island of Faial in the Portuguese archipelago of the Azores. With an abundance of biodiversity, the bank is a fishing area, in addition to being an important diving spot of the Atlantic Ocean.

History
The bank was named after the oceanographic campaign of Prince Albert I of Monaco, whose research vessel Princess Alice was involved in its discovery on 9 July 1896.

The bathymetric survey was entrusted to captain Charlwood Henry Carrd (1848-1918), who was also the prince's field assistant and navigator of the Princesse Alice. Carr was responsible for the original depth measurements at Princess Alice Bank.

On 13 July 1896, from Faial, Prince Albert telegrammed King Carlos I of Portugal announcing the discovery and informing him of the usefulness of the bank for fishing. Returning to Monaco, on 21 August, the prince circulated a press statement reporting the discovery and stressing its importance to Azorean fisheries. In gratitude for the discovery, King Carlos awarded the prince with the "grand collar" of the Order of Santiago, having already granted Captain Carr the honorific degree of master of the Order of St. Benedict in 1894. Increasingly Princess Alice Bank has become one of the main areas for fishing exploration within the Central Group of the Azorean islands.

Geography
An area of  around the bank, measured from the coasts of the closest islands, was established by the European Union as a reserve for Azorean fishermen. Princess Alice Bank is one of the main points of friction, or disagreement, in the current dispute between the Regional Government of the Azores and the European Union regarding the reform of the common fisheries policy.

External links
  Dive at Princess Alice Bank
  The ships of Albert I, including the Princesse Alice
  Departamento de Oceanografia e Pescas (DOP) da Universidade dos Açores - Department of Oceanography and Fisheries of the University of the Azores

Geology of the Azores
Fishing areas of the Atlantic Ocean
Seamounts of the Atlantic Ocean
Undersea banks of the Atlantic Ocean